Ponérihouen  is a commune in the North Province of New Caledonia, an overseas territory of France in the Pacific Ocean.

Ponérihouen is the birthplace of the writer, feminist and politician Déwé Gorodey, who served as vice-president of the congress from 2001 to 2009.

References

Communes of New Caledonia